Mount Assiniboine Provincial Park is a provincial park in British Columbia, Canada, located around Mount Assiniboine.

History
The park was established 1922. Some of the more recent history that is explorable within the park include Wheeler's Wonder Lodge (Naiset) (1924), Assiniboine Lodge (1928), the first ski lodge in the Canadian Rockies, and Sunburst (1928).

World Heritage Site
In 1990, this park was included within the Canadian Rocky Mountain Parks UNESCO World Heritage Site.  Together with the other national and provincial parks that comprise the Canadian Rocky Mountain Parks, the park was recognized for its natural beauty and the geological and ecological significance of its mountain landscapes containing the habitats of rare and endangered species, mountain peaks, glaciers, lakes, waterfalls, canyons, limestone caves and fossils.

Conservation
The park aims to protect a large variety of species. Eighty-four species of birds inhabit the park environs, based on sightings. Columbian ground squirrels are very common in the core area of the park. Ten species of carnivore including wolves, black bear, grizzly bear, weasel, cougar, lynx inhabit the park. Six species of ungulates: elk, mule deer, white-tailed deer, moose, mountain goat, Rocky Mountain bighorn sheep roam within park boundaries.

Recreation
The following recreational activities are available: backcountry camping and hiking, horseback riding, cross country skiing and ski touring, fishing, and hunting. There are also climbing opportunities. Existing facilities include: 10 camping areas (75 campsites), including the main camp at Magog; 6 roofed accommodation sites (60 beds), including Mt. Assiniboine Lodge; day-use facilities at Rock Isle basin, including interpretive facilities and sanitation; 160 km of horse and hiking access trails: Assiniboine Pass, Wonder Pass, Mitchell River, Simpson River, Citadel Pass, Surprise Creek; and guide-outfitters cabins: Mitchell River and Police Meadows.

Location
Located 48 kilometres southwest of Banff, Alberta. No roads access the park. Backcountry hiking trails are the only access to the park, the quickest route being via Sunshine Village ski area in Banff National Park.

See also
List of British Columbia Provincial Parks
List of Canadian provincial parks

References

External links

 Assiniboine Lodge

 
Columbia Valley
1922 establishments in British Columbia
Protected areas established in 1922